The index of physics articles is split into multiple pages due to its size.

To navigate by individual letter use the table of contents below.

R

R-factor (crystallography)
R-hadron
R-parity
R-process
R-symmetry
R. A. Stradling
R. Orin Cornett
R. S. Krishnan
R. Stanley Williams
R. Stephen Berry
R136a1
R1 (nuclear reactor)
R4 nuclear reactor
RA-1 Enrico Fermi
RC time constant
RF antenna ion source
RHEED-TRAXS
RKKY interaction
RNS formalism
ROI PAC
ROOT
RRKM theory
RT (energy)
RX J0806.3+1527
R (cross section ratio)
RaLa Experiment
Rabbit (nuclear engineering)
Rabi cycle
Rabi frequency
Rabi problem
Radial distribution function
Radial motion
Radial polarization
Radial velocity
Radian per second
Radian per second squared
Radiance
Radiant barrier
Radiant energy
Radiant flux
Radiant intensity
Radiation
Radiation-dominated era
Radiation chemistry
Radiation damping
Radiation flux
Radiation hormesis
Radiation impedance
Radiation implosion
Radiation intelligence
Radiation length
Radiation material science
Radiation monitoring
Radiation pressure
Radiation protection
Radiation scattering
Radiation stress
Radiation trapping
Radiational cooling
Radiative cooling
Radiative equilibrium
Radiative heat transfer
Radiative process
Radiative transfer
Radio-frequency induction
Radio-frequency quadrupole
Radio Ice Cerenkov Experiment
Radio astronomy
Radio frequency
Radio galaxy
Radio noise source
Radio occultation
Radio spectrum pollution
Radio waves
Radio window
Radioactive Substances Act 1993
Radioactive decay
Radioactive displacement law of Fajans and Soddy
Radioactive waste
Radioanalytical chemistry
Radiobiology
Radiochemistry
Radiodensity
Radiogenic nuclide
Radiographic equipment
Radiography
Radiohalo
Radioisotope piezoelectric generator
Radioisotope thermoelectric generator
Radioluminescence
Radiometer
Radiometric dating
Radiometry
Radion (physics)
Radiophysics
Radioscope
Radiosity (heat transfer)
Radium and radon in the environment
Radius of curvature (optics)
Radius of gyration
Rafael Bruschweiler
Rafael Ghazaryan
Rafael Sorkin
Rahul Mahajan (blogger)
Rainbow
Rainbow hologram
Rainer Blatt
Rainout
Raja Ramanna
Rajaram Nityananda
Rajesh Gopakumar
Rajnath Singh
Ralph A. Sawyer
Ralph Asher Alpher
Ralph H. Fowler
Ralph Kronig
Ralph Lapp
Ralph Pudritz
Ralph von Frese
Ram pressure
Rama Bansil
Ramamurti Shankar
Raman Prinja
Raman Sundrum
Raman laser
Raman microscope
Raman scattering
Ramanuja Vijayaraghavan
Rammal Rammal
Ramond sector
Ramond–Ramond field
Ramsauer–Townsend effect
Randall J. LeVeque
Randall–Sundrum model
Random close pack
Random energy model
Random laser
Random matrix
Random phase approximation
Range (particle radiation)
Rangefinder
Rankine cycle
Rankine vortex
Rankine–Hugoniot conditions
Raoul Franklin
Raoul Pictet
Raoult's law
Raphael Tsu
Rapid phase transition
Rapid single flux quantum
Rapidity
Rare-earth magnet
Rare Earth hypothesis
Rare Isotope Accelerator
Rare Symmetry Violating Processes
Rarefaction
Rarita-Schwinger action
Rarita–Schwinger equation
Rashba effect
Rashid Sunyaev
Rate of heat flow
Rational conformal field theory
Raul Rabadan
Ravi Grover
Ray (optics)
Ray Kidder
Ray Mackintosh
Ray Streater
Ray tracing (physics)
Ray transfer matrix analysis
Raychaudhuri equation
Rayleigh distance
Rayleigh flow
Rayleigh law
Rayleigh number
Rayleigh scattering
Rayleigh–Bénard convection
Rayleigh–Gans approximation
Rayleigh–Jeans law
Rayleigh–Plesset equation
Rayleigh–Taylor instability
Raymond Chiao
Raymond Davis, Jr.
Raymond Gosling
Raymond Herb
Raymond Hide
Raymond Jeanloz
Raymond L. Orbach
Raymond Seeger
Raymond Thayer Birge
Raynor Johnson
Raziuddin Siddiqui
Reactimeter
Reaction (physics)
Reaction coordinate
Reaction field method
Reactionless drive
Reaction–diffusion–advection equation
Reactive centrifugal force
Reactor-grade plutonium
Reactor Experiment for Neutrino Oscillation
Reactor building
Reactor protection system
Reactor vessel
Real-is-positive convention
Real-time Neutron Monitor Database
Real gas
Real neutral particle
Rear flank downdraft
Reber Radio Telescope
Received noise power
Receiver (modulated ultrasound)
Reciprocal lattice
Reciprocal space
Reciprocating oscillation
Reciprocity (electrical networks)
Reciprocity (electromagnetism)
Recoil temperature
Recombination (cosmology)
Rectangular potential barrier
Rectilinear lens
Rectilinear propagation
Recuperator
Recurrence plot
Recurrence quantification analysis
Red adaptation goggles
Red clump
Red dwarf
Redlich–Kwong equation of state
Redshift
Redshift quantization
Redshift survey
Reduced mass
Reduced moderation water reactor
Reduced pressure
Reduced properties
Reduced temperature
Reduction criterion
Reed Research Reactor
Reeh–Schlieder theorem
Reentrant superconductivity
Reference beam
Reference noise
Reference surface
Reflectin
Reflection (physics)
Reflection coefficient
Reflection high-energy electron diffraction
Reflections on the Motive Power of Fire
Reflectivity
Reflectometric interference spectroscopy
Refraction
Refractive index
Refractive index contrast
Refractive indices
Refrigeration
Refrigerator
Regelation
Regenerative amplification
Regenerative fuel cell
Regge calculus
Regge theory
Reginald Victor Jones
Regnier de Graaf
Regularization (physics)
Reimar Lüst
Reiner Kruecken
Reinhard Meinel
Reinhard Oehme
Reinhold Bertlmann
Reinhold Ewald
Reinhold Mannkopff
Reionization
Reissner–Nordström metric
Relation between Schrödinger's equation and the path integral formulation of quantum mechanics
Relational quantum mechanics
Relational theory
Relationship between string theory and quantum field theory
Relative angular momentum
Relative density
Relative humidity
Relative intensity noise
Relative locality
Relative permeability
Relative permittivity
Relative pressure
Relative velocity
Relative viscosity
Relative wind
Relativistic Breit–Wigner distribution
Relativistic Doppler effect
Relativistic Euler equations
Relativistic Heavy Ion Collider
Relativistic aberration
Relativistic beaming
Relativistic dynamics
Relativistic electromagnetism
Relativistic electron beam
Relativistic heat conduction
Relativistic jet
Relativistic mechanics
Relativistic nuclear collisions
Relativistic particle
Relativistic plasma
Relativistic quantum chemistry
Relativistic similarity parameter
Relativistic speed
Relativistic wave equations
Relativity: The Special and the General Theory
Relativity of simultaneity
Relativity priority dispute
Relaxation (NMR)
Relaxation (physics)
Relaxation length
Relaxed stability
Relaxometry
Relic particles
Religious views of Albert Einstein
Reluctance
Remanence
Remission (spectroscopy)
Remo Ruffini
Remote plasma
Remote sensing
Renata Kallosh
Renate Loll
Renewable energy
Renewable energy debate
Renninger negative-result experiment
Renormalizable
Renormalization
Renormalization group
Renormalon
Replica trick
Reports on Progress in Physics
Representation theory of the Galilean group
Representation theory of the Poincaré group
Reprocessed uranium
Reptation Monte Carlo
Research Letters in Physics
Research reactor
Residual chemical shift anisotropy
Residual entropy
Residual flux density
Residual gas analyzer
Residual property (physics)
Residual strength
Residual stress
Resilience
Resist
Resistance distance
Resistive skin time
Resolved sideband cooling
Resonance
Resonance (particle)
Resonance (particle physics)
Resonance chamber
Resonance disaster
Resonant inelastic X-ray scattering
Resonant magnetic perturbations
Resonating valence bond theory
Resonator
Response reactions
Resputtering
Rest (physics)
Rest energy
Rest frame
Restoring force
Restricted open-shell Hartree–Fock
Resultant tone
Resummation
Retarded position
Retarded potential
Retarded time
Retentivity
Retreating blade stall
Retrocausality
Retroflect
Retrograde condensation
Retrogression heat treatment
Revaz Dogonadze
Reverberation
Reverberation chamber
Reverberation room
Reverse diffusion
Reverse leakage current
Reverse phase velocity
Reverse phasevelocity
Reversed field pinch
Reversible dynamics
Reversible process (thermodynamics)
Reversible reference system propagation algorithm
Reversing thermometer
Review of Scientific Instruments
Reviews of Geophysics
Reviews of Modern Physics
Reyn
Reynolds-averaged Navier–Stokes equations
Reynolds decomposition
Reynolds number
Reynolds operator
Reynolds stress
Reynolds transport theorem
Reza Mansouri
Rheology
Rheometer
Rheometry
Rheonomous
Rheopecty
Rheoscope
Rheoscopic fluid
Rho meson
Rhombohedral lattice system
Riabouchinsky solid
Riazuddin (physicist)
Riccardo Giacconi
Ricci calculus
Ricci curvature
Ricci decomposition
Richard A. Muller
Richard Arnowitt
Richard Becker (physicist)
Richard Beeching, Baron Beeching
Richard Bolt
Richard C. Lord
Richard C. Powell
Richard C. Tolman
Richard Christopher Carrington
Richard Clegg
Richard D. Gill
Richard D. James (scientist)
Richard D. Leapman
Richard Dalitz
Richard Davisson
Richard Dixon Oldham
Richard Duffin
Richard E. Berendzen
Richard E. Hayden
Richard E. Taylor
Richard Ellis (astronomer)
Richard Epp (physicist)
Richard Ernest Kronauer
Richard F. Post
Richard Feynman
Richard Franklin Humphreys
Richard Friend
Richard G. Compton
Richard Gans
Richard Garwin
Richard Gill (physicist)
Richard Glazebrook
Richard H. Price
Richard Hammond (physicist)
Richard J. Gambino
Richard K. Yamamoto
Richard Keith Ellis
Richard L. Abrams
Richard Liboff
Richard Lindzen
Richard M. Weiner
Richard Makinson
Richard Massey
Richard Mollier
Richard P.A.C. Newman
Richard P. Turco
Richard Schoen
Richard Scott Perkin
Richard Sears McCulloh
Richard Sillitto
Richard T. Whitcomb
Richard Threlkeld Cox
Richard W. Ziolkowski
Richard Wolfson (physicist)
Richard von Mises
Richards equation
Richardson number
Richtmyer–Meshkov instability
Ricky J Sethi
Ridge lift
Ridged mirror
Ridley–Watkins–Hilsum theory
Riemann curvature tensor
Riemann solver
Riemann tensor (general relativity)
Riemannian Penrose inequality
Riemann–Silberstein vector
Rietdijk–Putnam argument
Rietveld refinement
Riggatron
Right-hand rule
Right hand grip rule
Rigid-body kinematics
Rigid body
Rigid body dynamics
Rigid rotor
Rijke tube
Rindler coordinates
Ring-imaging Cherenkov detector
Ring current
Ring laser
Ring laser gyroscope
Ring singularity
Ring wave guide
Rip current
Ripple (electrical)
Rise over thermal
Rishon model
Ritz method
Rivista del Nuovo Cimento
Roald Sagdeev
Rob Adam
Robbert Dijkgraaf
Robert A. Woodruff
Robert Adair (physicist)
Robert Alfano
Robert Andrews Millikan
Robert Arns
Robert Aymar
Robert Ayres (scientist)
Robert B. Laughlin
Robert B. Leighton
Robert Bacher
Robert Bindschadler
Robert Blinc
Robert Boyle
Robert Brout
Robert Bruce Lindsay
Robert C. Duncan (astrophysicist)
Robert C. Dynes
Robert Coleman Richardson
Robert Corey
Robert Cornog
Robert D. Maurer
Robert D. Richtmyer
Robert Delbourgo
Robert Dunkin
Robert Döpel
Robert E. Hopkins
Robert E. Vardeman
Robert Edward Bell
Robert Emden
Robert F. Beck
Robert F. Christy
Robert Fischell
Robert G. Chambers
Robert G. Greenler
Robert G. Shulman
Robert Geroch
Robert Griffiths (physicist)
Robert H. Dicke
Robert H. Lieberman
Robert H. Williams (physicist)
Robert Haynes
Robert Herman
Robert Hofstadter
Robert Hooke
Robert J. Birgeneau
Robert J. Lang
Robert J. Van de Graaff
Robert Jaffe
Robert K. Logan
Robert Karplus
Robert Kirby-Harris
Robert Kraichnan
Robert L. Byer
Robert L. Forward
Robert L. Hurt
Robert L. Park
Robert Leigh
Robert Lin
Robert Lyster Thornton
Robert M. L. Baker, Jr.
Robert Mallet
Robert Marshak
Robert Matthews (scientist)
Robert Mills (physicist)
Robert Morris Page
Robert Myers (physicist)
Robert Norman
Robert Noyce
Robert Ochsenfeld
Robert P. Madden
Robert Parr
Robert Pohl
Robert Pound
Robert R. Shannon
Robert R. Wilson
Robert Resnick
Robert Retherford
Robert Rosner
Robert Russell Newton
Robert S. Mulliken
Robert S. Shankland
Robert Shaw (physicist)
Robert Sproull
Robert Strutt, 4th Baron Rayleigh
Robert Thomas Jones (engineer)
Robert T. Siegel
Robert W. Bower
Robert W. Boyd
Robert W. Bussard
Robert W. Wood
Robert Wald
Robert Were Fox the Younger
Robert William Boyle
Robert Woodrow Wilson
Robert von Lieben
Roberto Abraham
Roberto Car
Roberto Merlin
Roberto Peccei
Roberto Salmeron
Roberval balance
Robijn Bruinsma
Robin Devenish
Robinson oscillator
Robinson–Dadson curves
Robley C. Williams
Robot kinematics
Robotic telescope
Roche limit
Rochon prism
Rock magnetism
Rocket engine nozzle
Rocket glider
Rod C. Alferness
Rod Crewther
Rod Cross
Roddam Narasimha
Roderich Moessner
Rodney Baxter
Rodney Cotterill
Rodney Jory
Rodney Marks (astrophysicist)
Rodney S. Ruoff
Rodolfo Gambini
Roe solver
Roentgen (unit)
Roentgen equivalent man
Rogallo wing
Roger Balian
Roger Cashmore
Roger Cowley
Roger Jones (physicist and entrepreneur)
Roger Penrose
Roger Temam
Rogue wave
Roland Benz
Roland Dobbs
Roland Dobrushin
Roland Hüttenrauch
Roland Omnès
Roland W. Schmitt
Rolf-Dieter Heuer
Rolf Hagedorn
Rolf Landauer
Rolf Maximilian Sievert
Rolf Michel
Rolf Widerøe
Roll center
Roll moment
Rollin film
Rolling
Rolling ball argument
Rolling cone motion
Rolling resistance
Roman Jackiw
Roman Ulrich Sexl
Roman pot
Roman ring
Ronald Collé
Ronald Drever
Ronald E. Cohen
Ronald Ernest Aitchison
Ronald F. Probstein
Ronald Fedkiw
Ronald Kantowski
Ronald McNair
Ronald N. Bracewell
Ronald Rivlin
Ronald W. Gurney
Ronald W. Yeung
Ronnie Bell
Ronold W. P. King
Room-temperature superconductor
Room acoustics
Room temperature
Root-mean-square speed
Roothaan equations
Roper resonance
Rosalind Franklin
Rosalyn Sussman Yalow
Rosatom
Rosemary Wyse
Roshko number
Ross H. McKenzie
Rossby number
Rossby wave
Rossiter–McLaughlin effect
Roswell Clifton Gibbs
Rotameter
Rotating black hole
Rotating furnace
Rotating radio transient
Rotating reference frame
Rotating spheres
Rotating tank
Rotating wave approximation
Rotation
Rotation-powered pulsar
Rotation around a fixed axis
Rotation number
Rotation operator (quantum mechanics)
Rotational Brownian motion
Rotational diffusion
Rotational energy
Rotational invariance
Rotational motion
Rotational speed
Rotational temperature
Rotational transition
Rotational–vibrational coupling
Roton
Rotordynamics
Rotor–stator interaction
Rouse model
Rouse number
Route dependence
Routhian
Rovibrational coupling
Rovibronic coupling
Rowland ring
Roy J. Glauber
Roy Kerr
Roy McWeeny
Roy Sambles
Roy Schwitters
Royal Astronomical Society
Rp-process
Ruark number
Rubber elasticity
Rubens tube
Rubidium standard
Ruby Payne-Scott
Ruby laser
Rudder ratio
Rudolf Clausius
Rudolf Fleischmann
Rudolf Grimm
Rudolf Haag
Rudolf Kingslake
Rudolf Kohlrausch
Rudolf Kompfner
Rudolf Ladenburg
Rudolf Luneburg
Rudolf M. Tromp
Rudolf Mössbauer
Rudolf Peierls
Rudolf Podgornik
Rudolf Schulten
Rudolf Seeliger
Rudolf Tomaschek
Rudolph Koenig
Rudolph Schild
Ruggero Santilli
Rui-Ming Xu
Rumble (noise)
Runaway breakdown
Rush D. Holt, Jr.
Rushbrooke inequality
Russell Alan Hulse
Russell Stannard
Russell Targ
Russell–Einstein Manifesto
Rustle noise
Rutherford backscattering spectrometry
Rutherford cable
Rutherford model
Rutherford scattering
Rydberg atom
Rydberg constant
Rydberg formula
Rydberg matter
Rydberg molecule
Rydberg state
Rydberg–Klein–Rees method
Rydberg–Ritz combination principle
Ryogo Kubo
Rytov number
Rényi entropy
Rømer's determination of the speed of light

Indexes of physics articles